James MacDonald or Macdonald may refer to:

People

Arts and entertainment
J. E. H. MacDonald (1873–1932), Canadian painter, member of the Group of Seven
James Stuart MacDonald (1878–1952), art critic and Director of the Art Gallery of NSW
Jimmy MacDonald (sound effects artist) (1906–1991), voice of Mickey Mouse
James D. Macdonald (born 1954), American author and critic
James MacDonald (actor), Canadian actor
James Macdonald (director) (born 1958), British theater and film director
James Wilson Alexander MacDonald, American sculptor

Politics
Sir James Macdonald, 2nd Baronet (1784–1832), British Member of Parliament for Tain Burghs, Newcastle-under-Lyme, Sutherland, Calne, and Hampshire
James William MacDonald (1811–1881), politician in colonial South Australia and Colonial Treasurer
James E. MacDonald (1842–1903), former politician in Prince Edward Island, Canada
James MacDonald (trade unionist) (1857–1938), Secretary of the London Trades Council
James Alexander MacDonald (1858–1919), lawyer, judge and leader of the British Columbia Liberal Party
James Ramsay MacDonald (1866–1937), British Prime Minister
Jim MacDonald (politician) (1917–1989), Australian politician
James David Macdonald (politician) (1922–1995), City of Calgary alderman and author of Grand Cayman's tax haven law
James H. MacDonald (1832–1889), Lieutenant Governor of Michigan

Sports
James MacDonald (cricketer) (1906–1969), Irish cricketer
James Macdonald (footballer), Scottish footballer
Kilby MacDonald (James Allan Macdonald, 1913–1986), Canadian ice hockey player
James Jamie MacDonald (footballer) (born 1986), Scottish football goalkeeper

Other
James MacDonald, 6th of Dunnyveg (died 1565), Scoto-Irish chieftain
Sir James MacDonald, 9th of Dunnyveg (died 1626), last chief of Clan MacDonald of Dunnyveg or Clan Donald South
James Macdonald (British Army officer) (1862–1927), Scottish engineer, explorer and cartographer
James A. Macdonald (1862–1923), newspaper editor, educator, minister and author in Ontario, Canada
James Alexander MacDonald (botanist) (1908–1997), Scottish botanist and plant pathologist
James Macdonald (ornithologist) (1908–2002), British and Australian ornithologist and ornithological writer
James E. McDonald (1920–1971), American meteorologist and UFO researcher
James Ross MacDonald (born 1923), American physicist
James MacDonald (pastor) (born 1960), disqualified pastor of Harvest Bible Chapel, Walk in the Word and Harvest Bible Fellowship
Sir James Mor Macdonald, 2nd Baronet, Scottish nobleman and soldier
James MacDonald (police officer) (1968–1993), murdered American police officer

Fictional characters
James MacDonald (Arthur character), a minor character in the TV series Arthur

See also

 Jamie McDonald (disambiguation), including Jamie MacDonald
 James McDonald (disambiguation)
 James Macdonnell (disambiguation)
Jimmy MacDonald, main character of the television mockumentary series Jimmy MacDonald's Canada